Casey Kelly is an American songwriter and musician.

Kelly has written several Grammy-nominated songs.  His many hits include four Top Ten Country Music Hits: "Anyone Who Isn't Me Tonight" by Kenny Rogers and Dottie West (Grammy Nominated), "Soon" by Tanya Tucker (Grammy Nominated), "Somewhere Down the Line" by T G Shepherd and country music standard, "The Cowboy Rides Away" by George Strait.  He works as a session player and singer and performs in clubs and concerts for audiences throughout the US and Europe.  A frequent mentor, panelist and workshop contributor, Casey is a member of ASCAP,  NSAI the Songwriters Guild of America Board of Councilors.  The Complete Idiot's Guide to the Art of Songwriting is his first published book.

Music career
Kelly began his career performing in Baton Rouge with a local group known as the Greek Fountains.  He then moved to New York City to work as a session musician and singer, songwriter, arranger, music publisher, record producer and record company executive.  He toured with Tom Rush, playing guitar, harmonica, and piano and then went to Los Angeles where he signed a recording deal with producer Joe Wissert through Warner Brothers Records. After releasing a single at Warner Brothers Records he moved on to A&M Records and formed the Luziana Band which was recorded by Jim Hilton.

His next label deal was at Elektra Records where he worked with producer Richard Sanford Orshoff, recording two nationally acclaimed LP's, "Casey Kelly" and "For Sale". He toured extensively opening shows and performing with various acts including America and Frank Zappa.

Songwriting career
Recruited by famous publisher/producer Bob Montgomery, Kelly moved to Nashville in 1978, where he has lived ever since writing songs for many of the major publishers and artists.  In addition to his top ten country hits, he also wrote “That Road Not Taken” by Joe Diffie, "Only Game in Town" by America and "Resign Yourself" by the Nitty Gritty Dirt Band. He also had a radio hit with his own song "Poor Boy".

Chart singles
The following is a list of Casey Kelly compositions that were chart hits.

Recordings by Casey Kelly
1972: "Casey Kelly" – Casey Kelly
1973: "For Sale" –  Casey Kelly
1995: "Himownself: The Hits" - Casey Kelly
2017: "The Long Road to You" - Kelly&Ellis (Casey Kelly and Leslie Ellis)

Books Written by Casey Kelly
In 2011, Kelly and co-writer David Hodge released a self-help text for songwriters entitled The Complete Idiot's Guide to the Art of Songwriting.

References

Living people
American country songwriters
American male songwriters
Musicians from Nashville, Tennessee
1949 births